Events from the year 2009 in Scotland

Incumbents 

First Minister and Keeper of the Great Seal – Alex Salmond
 Secretary of State for Scotland – Jim Murphy

Law officers 
 Lord Advocate – Elish Angiolini
 Solicitor General for Scotland – Frank Mulholland
 Advocate General for Scotland – Lord Davidson of Glen Clova

Judiciary 
 Lord President of the Court of Session and Lord Justice General – Lord Hamilton
 Lord Justice Clerk – Lord Gill
 Chairman of the Scottish Land Court – Lord McGhie

Events 
25 January (Burns Night)–30 November (St Andrew's Day) – Homecoming Scotland.

January 
 13 January – minor earthquake in Shetland.
 24 January – 2009 Buachaille Etive Mòr avalanche: three climbers are killed in an avalanche on Buachaille Etive Mòr in the Highlands. Five others walk away uninjured, whilst another suffers a shoulder injury.
 28 January – the Scottish Parliament rejects the budget tabled by the Scottish National Party administration. The Presiding Officer casts the deciding vote after the result is originally tied at 64 in favour, 64 against. The Scottish Finance Secretary, John Swinney, says the budget will be put before parliament again as soon as is possible, whilst the First Minister, Alex Salmond, reportedly puts the SNP on an 'election footing' in case the budget were to be voted down once more.

February 
 4 February – the Scottish Parliament approves the minority SNP's administration's budget at the second time of asking. Both Labour and the Liberal Democrats vote for the budget after voting it down the previous time.

March 
 30 March – major power cut hits Glasgow and parts of the West of Scotland, causing traffic chaos in most areas.

April 
 1 April – Marine Scotland is established.
 3 April – Glasgow school closures protest, 2009 begins.
 5 April – Andy Murray wins the 2009 Sony Ericsson Open – Men's Singles in tennis.
 8 April – Slovakian Marek Harcar is jailed for at least 25 years after being found guilty of raping and murdering Moira Jones in a Glasgow park.
 13 April – Scotland win the 2009 World Men's Curling Championship in Moncton, Canada.
 30 April – Beltane.

May 
 4 May – John Higgins wins the 2009 World Snooker Championship.
 14 May – Tradeston Bridge opens for pedestrians across the River Clyde in Glasgow.
 22 May – Whitelee Wind Farm, the largest wind farm in Europe, officially opens.

June 
 4 June – the SNP tops the poll in the European Election in Scotland, winning two of Scotland's six MEPs. Labour also win two, with the Conservatives and Liberal Democrats winning one each.
 14 June (20:30 BST) – the first human death from the 2009 swine flu pandemic in the United Kingdom is confirmed by the Scottish Government.
 15 June – the Commission on Scottish Devolution, chaired by Kenneth Calman, issues its final report, recommending that the Scottish Parliament be given greater control over tax and legislation such as setting speed limits.
25–28 June – Royal Highland Show.

July 
 7 July – Royal Navy Queen Elizabeth-class aircraft carrier  laid down at BAE Systems, Govan; she will be assembled at Rosyth Dockyard.
16–19 July – Open Championship, Turnberry (golf course), South Ayrshire.

August 
 2 August – Catriona Matthew wins the 2009 Women's British Open in golf.
 11 August – archaeologists announce that they have discovered a royal tomb from the early Bronze Age, at Forteviot.
 14 August – archaeologists announce that they have discovered a Neolithic temple in the Heart of Neolithic Orkney World Heritage Site.
 20 August – the Scottish justice secretary Kenny MacAskill grants release to the convicted Lockerbie bomber Abdelbaset al-Megrahi on compassionate grounds, stating that Megrahi is in the final stages of terminal prostate cancer.

September 
 15 September – Geology of Scotland: Shetland awarded European Geopark status.

October 
 27 October – the West Highland Free Press becomes the UK's only employee-owned newspaper.

November 
 16 November – Galloway Forest Park is designated at a dark sky park by the International Dark-Sky Association.
 20 November – John Swinney, Cabinet Secretary for Finance and Sustainable Growth, wins the Scottish Politician of the Year Award.
 26 November – BrewDog launches a new beer called Tactical Nuclear Penguin, with 32% alcohol, which is claimed to be the strongest beer ever made.

December 
 1 December – the first reshuffle of the Scottish Cabinet since the Scottish National Party came to power in May 2007.
 4–12 December – 2009 European Curling Championships, Aberdeen.
 16 December – Scotland's largest airline, Flyglobespan, goes into administration.
 17 December – archaeologists announce that they have found man-made structures on the sea-bed off the island of Damsay, Orkney.
 20 December – Richie Ramsay wins the South African Open (golf), Scotland's first win on the European Tour since Alastair Forsyth won the Madeira Island Open in March 2008.
 21 December – Fraochy Bay television cartoon series airs.
 30 December – three climbers are killed following three large avalanches in the Scottish mountains.

Deaths

January 
 7 January – Alfie Conn Sr., footballer (born 1926)
 29 January – John Martyn, singer-songwriter (born 1948)

February 
 6 February – Bashir Ahmad, Scottish National Party MSP for Glasgow (born 1940)
 17 February – Victor Kiernan, Marxist historian (born 1913 in England)
 19 February – Anna Watt, variety entertainer (born 1924)

April 
 30 April – Maurice Lindsay, broadcaster, writer and poet (died 1918)

June 
 7 June – Gordon Lennon, footballer (born 1983)

July 
 6 July – Jim Reid, folk musician (born 1934)
 29 July – Paul McGrillen, footballer, by suicide (born 1971)

September 
 23 September – Bill Speirs, general secretary of the Scottish Trades Union Congress, and key figure on the left of the Scottish Labour Party, and in the campaign for Scottish devolution, instrumental in the creation of Scotland United, a member of the Scottish Constitutional Convention and a member of the group that drafted the key document Scotland's Parliament, Scotland's Right in 1995 (born 1952)
 28 September – Reverend Maxwell Craig, the Extra Chaplain to the Queen

October 
 11 October – Abigail McLellan, painter (born 1969)

December 
 1 December – Cordelia Oliver,  journalist, painter and art critic (born 1923)

The Arts 
 17–28 June – Edinburgh International Film Festival.
 September – Emma's Imagination releases her debut single, "Stamp Your Feet", on Glasgow independent label Up Next Records.
 23 November – Susan Boyle's first album, I Dreamed a Dream becomes Amazon's best-selling album in pre-sales.
 Peter Maxwell Davies composes his string sextet The Last Island.

See also 

 2009 in England
 2009 in Northern Ireland
 2009 in Wales

References 

 
Scotland
Years of the 21st century in Scotland
2000s in Scotland